D315 is a state road branching off from D409 state road connecting it to Trogir.

In Trogir, the road crosses from the mainland to Čiovo Island via a movable bridge. A new movable bridge is planned to be completed outside the city centre, and at such time, the D126 route is expected to be relocated as well. The construction appears to be delayed though.

The road, as well as all other state roads in Croatia, is managed and maintained by Hrvatske ceste, a state-owned company.

Road junctions

Sources

State roads in Croatia
Transport in Split-Dalmatia County